Steven Nash Jackson (born March 15, 1982) is an American former Major League Baseball pitcher who played for the Pittsburgh Pirates in 2009 and 2010.

Amateur career
A native of Sumter, South Carolina, Jackson attended Summerville High School and Clemson University. He pitched for Clemson for four years, going 19-8. In 2001 and 2002, he played collegiate summer baseball with the Falmouth Commodores of the Cape Cod Baseball League.

He was selected by the Tampa Bay Devil Rays in the 38th round of the 2000 MLB Draft, then by the Cleveland Indians in the 32nd round of the 2003 MLB Draft, and finally by the Arizona Diamondbacks in the 10th round of the 2004 MLB Draft.

Professional career

Arizona Diamondbacks
In the Diamondbacks minor league system from 2004–06, he was 19-17. In 2006 at AA Tennessee he was 8-11 with a 2.65 ERA in 24 starts.

New York Yankees
On January 9, 2007, he was traded by the Diamondbacks to the New York Yankees (along with Ross Ohlendorf, Luis Vizcaíno and Alberto Gonzalez) for Randy Johnson. He received an invitation to spring training with the Yankees but spent the 2007-2009 alternating between AA Trenton and AAA Scranton/Wilkes-Barre.

Pittsburgh Pirates
On May 8, 2009, he was designated for assignment by the Yankees and claimed off waivers by the Pittsburgh Pirates. He made his Major League debut for the Pirates on June 1, 2009 against the New York Mets, working one scoreless inning of relief. He appeared in 40 games in 2009 and 11 in 2010 for the Pirates, with a 2-4 record and 4.31 ERA. He also played 53 games with the AAA Indianapolis Indians during that stretch. In his 40 Major League appearances he gave up 38 hits, gave up 15 earned runs, gave up 2 home runs, walked 22 batters, struck out 21 batters, and had a .236 average against in just 43.0 innings with the Bucs.

On January 19, 2011, Jackson was designated for assignment by Pittsburgh.

Los Angeles Dodgers
On March 10, 2011 he signed a minor league contract with the Los Angeles Dodgers. He was assigned to the Double-A Chattanooga Lookouts and promoted to the AAA Albuquerque Isotopes on May 11.

Jackson was released by the Dodgers on May 19, 2011.

Cincinnati Reds
On May 22, 2011, Jackson signed a minor league contract with the Cincinnati Reds. He was assigned to the Triple-A Louisville Bats the following day.

Pittsburgh Pirates
On June 24, 2011, Jackson was traded to the Pirates for a player to be named later.

References

External links

1982 births
Living people
People from Summerville, South Carolina
Sportspeople from Sumter, South Carolina
Pittsburgh Pirates players
Baseball players from South Carolina
Major League Baseball pitchers
Missoula Osprey players
Yakima Bears players
South Bend Silver Hawks players
Tennessee Smokies players
Trenton Thunder players
Scranton/Wilkes-Barre Yankees players
Indianapolis Indians players
Chattanooga Lookouts players
Albuquerque Isotopes players
Clemson Tigers baseball players
Scottsdale Scorpions players
Peoria Javelinas players
Falmouth Commodores players